This is a list of hillside letters (also known as mountain monograms) in the U.S. state of Utah. Monograms in Utah include two of the oldest, at Brigham Young University (1906) and the University of Utah (1907). These symbols are so much a part of the culture that locals typically refer to the universities themselves as "The Y" and "The U", respectively.  Across the state, there are at least 87 hillside letters, acronyms, and messages.

†Originally painted as "1914 D", as a class "gift." The original plan was to paint over each year, but the next year the decision was made to paint and maintain "DIXIE"

References

External links

 Mountain Monograms, a website explaining the origins and with an incomplete list and pictures
 Hillside Letters, a companion website to a book on the subject
 Letters on Hills, a category on waymarking.com for geocachers
  Google Maps of DIXIE ROCK near road.

Hill figures in the United States
Utah geography-related lists
Lists of public art in the United States